Trechobembix baldiensis is a species of beetle in the family Carabidae, the only species in the genus Trechobembix.

References

Trechinae